Mao Zedong (1893–1976) was the leader of the People's Republic of China between 1949 and 1976.

Mao, or MAO, may also refer to:

People and tribes
 Mao (given name), a feminine Japanese given name
 Mao (surname), a Chinese surname
 Mao people (India), a Naga tribe in India

Acronyms
 Manual analog override, see manual override
 Maximum tolerable period of disruption, also known as maximum allowable/acceptable outage
 Methylaluminoxane, a pyrophoric white solid
 Molėtai Astronomical Observatory, Lithuania
 Monoamine oxidase, a family of enzymes
 Plasma electrolytic oxidation, also known as microarc oxidation

Codes
 Eduardo Gomes International Airport (IATA: MAO), in Manaus, Brazil
 Martins Heron railway station (National Rail code: MAO), in Berkshire, United Kingdom

Entertainment and media
 Mao (card game), a card game
 MAO (manga), a Japanese manga series
 Maō (TV series), a Japanese television series
 Mao Mao: Heroes of Pure Heart, an American animated television series
 Mao: The Unknown Story, a 2005 biography of Chinese Communist leader Mao Zedong
 Mao, a character in the anime series Endro!

Places
 Mahón, also known as Maó, a city on the island of Minorca, Spain
 Mäo (disambiguation), several places
 Mao, Chad, a city in Chad
 Mao County, in Sichuan, China
 Santa Cruz de Mao, also known as Mao,  a municipality of the Valverde province in the Dominican Republic
 Mao (Vidhan Sabha constituency), a legislative assembly constituency in Manipal state, India

Other uses
 Mah or Mao, the Zoroastrianism's divinity of the moon
 Mao (bird), a bird species Gymnomyza samoensis
 Mao (currency), one tenth of a Chinese yuan
 Mao (restaurant chain), Asian-cuisine restaurant chain in Dublin, Ireland
 Mao languages, a group of Omotic languages in western Ethiopia
 Mão, nickname of Brazilian beach soccer goalkeeper, Jenílson Rodrigues
 Ma‘o, a Hawaiian name for a species of cotton
 Maō, a demon or devil in Japanese mythology, folklore and fantasy
 Maotai, a brand of distilled Chinese liquor

See also
 Mu Alpha Theta (ΜΑΘ), the United States mathematics honor society for high school and two-year college students